Juan Carlos Alvarado (Guatemala, December 28, 1964) is a Christian singer known for his songs such as Jehová es mi guerrero, Cristo no está muerto, No basta, Soy duedor, Cristo vive, Vivo para cristo, El borde de su manto, Mi mejor adoración, El poderoso de israel, Celebra victorioso, Dios el mas grande, Santo es el señor, Porque eres digno, Pues tu glorioso eres señor, El señor es mi pastor, and many others.

In 2021, he was nominated in two categories at the Arpa Awards 2021, such as "Composition of the Year" and "Best Male Vocal Album" for the single "El Dios De Israel Es Poderoso".

Career
As a child, Alvarado had a passion for singing and playing the piano. In 1987, Alvarado recorded his first album, Digno de alabar with the group Palabra En Acción. In 1993 Alvarado recorded his first "Solo" album entitled Aviva el fuego. A year later Alvarado recorded "León de Judá" in Spanish under Word Records, an American label. After the production of Aviva el Fuego, Hosanna Integrity and Canzion Productions worked together with Alvarado to produce Glorificate and Tu Palabra consecutively in 1993. In 1995, Alvarado released "Hoy más que ayer". More recent releases include "Fuego" and "Tu palabra cantaré".

In 2019, the artist Kike Pavón decided to invite him to collaborate on his EP entitled "Ayer y Hoy", which paid tribute to songs and artists who were part of the renewing praise movement that was generated in Latin America, to perform "Mi Mejor Adoración", one of his songs with updated musical arrangements.

After more than ten years of his last production "Fuego", in 2020, Juan Carlos returns with a medley called "El Dios De Israel Es Poderoso" (in English, "The God of Israel is Powerful") containing 5 choruses, which were chosen for being well known in the eighties and nineties. Within this group of songs stands out "Son sus cuerdas de amor" (in English, "They are the strings of him"), which was composed and added based on Psalm 16. The audiovisual work is a musical single that refers to the album he is preparing entitled "Fuego 2". With this single, he was nominated in two categories at the Arpa Awards 2021, such as "Composition of the Year" and "Best Male Vocal Album".

Discography

With Palabra En Acción

Solo

References

External links
 

1964 births
Living people
Guatemalan male singers
Guatemalan male singer-songwriters
Guatemalan pianists
Guatemalan Christians
Male pianists
21st-century pianists